Gülalan is a village in the Buldan District of Denizli Province in Turkey.

References

Villages in Buldan District